2008 Mito HollyHock season

Competitions

Domestic results

J. League 2

Emperor's Cup

Player statistics

Other pages
 J. League official site

Mito HollyHock
Mito HollyHock seasons